RTHK TV 31 (formerly RTHK TV 31A for analogue TV) is a 24-hour Chinese-language free-to-air television channel in Hong Kong, owned by RTHK. It is one of RTHK's three channels alongside RTHK TV 32 and RTHK TV 33 on digital terrestrial television as part of the latter's expansion. All RTHK TV channels are funded by the administration every year.

History 
Since 2 April 2016, TV 31 and TV 33 began simulcast on analogue channel frequencies previously owned by Asia Television (ATV) after ATV's licences were revoked by the government over financial losses and internal conflicts. As a result, RTHK TV 31 expanded its broadcast hours from 6:30AM to 1:30AM the next day.

Since 2019, RTHK 31 broadcasts 24 hours a day.

The analogue television service (RTHK TV 31A) ceased on 30 November 2020.

Programming
Some of RTHK's produced programmes aired on commercial networks are also aired on this channel.

See also
ATV Home

References

External links
RTHK on DTT 
RTHK on DTT 

Television channels and stations established in 2014
Chinese-language television stations
Television stations in Hong Kong